Psalm 87 is the 87th psalm from the Book of Psalms. It was written by the sons of Korach. It describes Jerusalem as the center of the world or the "mother of nations", where God placed the Torah. In the slightly different numbering system of the Greek Septuagint version of the bible, and in its Latin translation, the Vulgate, this psalm is Psalm 86.

Text

Hebrew Bible version
Following is the Hebrew text of Psalm 87:

King James Version
The following is the full English text of the Psalm from the King James Bible.
A Psalm or Song for the sons of Korah.
 His foundation is in the holy mountains.
 The LORD loveth the gates of Zion more than all the dwellings of Jacob.
 Glorious things are spoken of thee, O city of God. Selah.
 I will make mention of Rahab and Babylon to them that know me: behold Philistia, and Tyre, with Ethiopia; this man was born there.
 And of Zion it shall be said, This and that man was born in her: and the highest himself shall establish her.
 The LORD shall count, when he writeth up the people, that this man was born there. Selah.
 As well the singers as the players on instruments shall be there: all my springs are in thee.

Commentary
The psalm is classified as one of the "Songs of Zion", looking to the future Jerusalem as the 'center of universal worship' and listing some of the surrounding nations (from which Jewish proselytes have come to the festivals) or as a 'reference to Jews who come from different countries in the dispersion'.

"Rahab" in verse 4 may refer to 'the primeval monster quelled by YHWH in ancient story' (cf. Psalm 89:10), here to represent "Egypt", whereas the 'springs' (verse 7) may symbolize "divine blessing", placing Zion as 'the source of the streams of Paradise'.

Christianity
Verse 3 inspired John Newton to write the hymn "Glorious Things of Thee Are Spoken" in 1779, later sung with music from Haydn's Gott erhalte Franz den Kaiser (1797).

Musical settings
Marc-Antoine Charpentier set around 1680, one "Fundamenta ejus in montibus sanctis", H.187 for 3 voices and continuo.

Arthur Hutchings set the text of Psalm 87 in his Her Foundations are on the Holy Hills, which is also the motto of Durham University.

References

External links 

 in Hebrew and English - Mechon-mamre
 King James Bible - Wikisource

087
Phoenicians in the Hebrew Bible